Bedford Esquires is a pub, nightclub and live music venue, located in the town of Bedford, England.

The venue opened in 1990 and is housed in a converted 19th century chapel. Covering two floors, both floors of the venue are used for live music. On the ground-floor is a pub named Danny's Bar. The bar is generally a showcase for local bands and musical acts. There is also a nightclub on the ground-floor which mostly specialises in indie and alternative rock music.

The first-floor often hosts more established artists. Some of the more notable acts to have played include Coldplay, Franz Ferdinand, Muse, The Libertines, Editors, The View, The Feeling, Bloc Party, Enter Shikari, Biffy Clyro, Feeder, Sisteray, Graham Coxon and Super Furry Animals.

During the Britpop era, Esquires gained a reputation for featuring bands that often broke into the music charts soon after their appearance. During this time the venue played host to the Bluetones, Elastica, Catatonia, Ocean Colour Scene, Echobelly, Shed Seven,  Supergrass and Sleeper.

As part of the 2019 'Independent Venue Week', Esquires hosted a live broadcast by Steve Lamacq on BBC Radio 6 Music featuring a live performance by Tim Burgess.

In 2020 due to the COVID-19 pandemic, Esquires launched a successful crowdfunding exercise in order to keep the venue operating.

Today Esquires features and promotes up-and-coming bands and artists touted by the publications such as the NME, and is a regular venue on the toilet circuit. It also plays host to a variety of local un-signed acts from Bedford and the surrounding area.

References

External links
 Official website
 MySpace page

Music venues in Bedfordshire
Nightclubs in England
Pubs in Bedfordshire
Buildings and structures in Bedford